Pacific Rim: The Black is a Japanese-Mexican-American<ref name="Japan_TV">{{cite web|url=https://www.theverge.com/2021/3/4/22313221/pacific-rim-the-black-netflix-anime-polygon-pictures-interview-kaiju|title=How Pacific Rim'''s sci-fi world was transformed into a Netflix animation|website=The Verge|date=4 March 2021 }}</ref> adult animated streaming television series based on and a continuation of the Pacific Rim films. The third installment overall of the titular franchise, the series was developed and co-written by Greg Johnson and Craig Kyle for Netflix. Season one debuted on March 4, 2021 while the second and final season was released on April 19, 2022.

Plot
Set in the same universe as the first movie and after an alternate version of events from Pacific Rim: Uprising, a race of monsters called Kaiju arise from the Pacific Rim and overrun the continent of Australia. Humans build gigantic armed robots, Jaegers, to fight back, but fail and the continent is abandoned leaving only isolated pockets of survivors. Teenage siblings Taylor and Hayley Travis are left behind by their parents who leave to combat the Kaiju but never return. Five years later, Hayley stumbles across a long-abandoned training Jaeger called Atlas Destroyer which she and Taylor activate and set out on a quest to find their parents. They not only have to deal with marauding Kaiju, but other survivors who are also fighting for survival and attempt to seize Atlas Destroyer themselves.

Voice cast
Main
 Gideon Adlon (English) and Yui Shimodaya (Japanese) as Hayley Travis
 Camryn Jones as young Hayley Travis
 Calum Worthy (English) and Yusuke Kobayashi (Japanese) as Taylor Travis
 Cole Keriazakos (English) and Yuki Urushiyama (Japanese) as young Taylor Travis
 Erica Lindbeck (English) and Iku Minase (Japanese) as Loa
 Ben Diskin as Kaiju bOy
 Victoria Grace (English) and Ayaka Shimoyamada (Japanese) as Mei
 Andy McPhee (English) and Jin Yamanoi (Japanese) as Shane

Recurring
 Jason Spisak (English) and Yuya Uchida (Japanese) as Ford Travis
 Allie MacDonald (English) and Yuko Kaida (Japanese) as Brina Travis
 David Errigo Jr. as Root
 Bryton James as Corey
 Martin Klebba (English) and Rui Kato (Japanese) as Spyder
 Leonardo Nam (English) and Daisuke Hirakawa (Japanese) as Rickter
 Nolan North as Marshall Rask
 Vincent Piazza (English) and Tomoya Yano (Japanese) as Joel Wyrick
 Ryan Robinson as Demarcus
 Ron Yuan as Shiro Ito

Guest
 Max Martini as Hercules "Herc" Hansen (archive audio)
 Rhys Darby as Bunyip Man

Production
In November 2018, Netflix announced that an anime series adaptation based on the films was in the works. It was originally set for a 2020 release. During their virtual "Anime Festival" livestream event in October 2020, its title Pacific Rim: The Black and a 2021 release window was revealed. A second season was also greenlit.

The series is produced by American company Legendary Television, and animated by Japanese studio Polygon Pictures. Greg Johnson and Marvel Comics writer Craig Kyle serve as showrunners, and Brandon Campbell is composing the series' music. The series is directed by Jae-hong Kim and Hiroyuki Hayashi, with episodic direction by Takeshi Iwata, Susumu Sugai, and Masayuki Uemoto, and art direction by Yūki Moriyama.

Several creators pitched ideas to Legendary, and it was ultimately the concept by showrunners Greg Johnson and Craig Kyle that ended up moving forward to be pitched to Netflix. Before production on the series itself began, Johnson and Kyle had thought about making the series in either 2D or 3D animation, but hadn't decided which to go with. The more they thought about the cost of the 2D animation, and the limits 2D animation would have on certain aspects of the series, such as how the camera would move in a highly-detailed 2D environment, the more they leaned towards using 3D animation. Ultimately, it was decided that they would produce the series in 3D animation, but they wanted to keep the 2D aesthetics, which led them to Polygon Pictures, because they were the "masters at this approach." Polygon Pictures representative director Shūzō John Shiota (who served as an executive producer on the series) and producer Jack Liang expressed excitement over the idea of producing a work within the Pacific Rim universe, and decided to take on the job. Polygon Pictures staff handled a majority of the series' design work, with some assistance by the western team's supervising director Jae-hong Kim, and both teams convened in Tokyo to discuss these designs.

Episodes
Series overview

Season 1 (2021)

Season 2 (2022)

ReleasePacific Rim: The Black was released on Netflix on March 4, 2021. A teaser trailer was released on February 1, followed by a full trailer on February 5. A final trailer was released on February 26.

Reception
The review aggregator website Rotten Tomatoes reported an 71% approval rating, based on 14 reviews, with an average rating of 7.10/10. The site's critical consensus reads, "While The Black carries over all the grit but little of the humor that distinguishes the Pacific Rim film franchise, its striking visuals and expansion of series lore will likely please Kaiju fans."

Prequel graphic novel
On February 22, 2022, a prequel graphic novel was released for the show. Entitled Pacific Rim: Blackout'', it was written by Cavan Scott and illustrated by Nelson Daniel.

Notes

References

External links
 
 
 

Pacific Rim (franchise)
2020s American adult animated television series
2021 American television series debuts
2021 anime ONAs
2022 American television series endings
Animated television series about robots
Animated television series about siblings
American adult computer-animated television series
Anime-influenced Western animated television series
Cyberpunk television series
Alien invasions in television
English-language Netflix original programming
Japanese computer-animated television series
Mecha animation
Netflix original anime
Polygon Pictures
Post-apocalyptic animated television series
Television series by Legendary Television
Television shows set in Australia